Spirama inconspicua is a species of moth of the family Erebidae. It is found in South Africa.

References

Endemic moths of South Africa
Moths described in 1854
Spirama
Moths of Africa
Taxa named by Gottlieb August Wilhelm Herrich-Schäffer